Fashian (also Romanized as Fashīān, Fashiyan, and Fashyān; also known as Fashium) is a village in Charam Rural District, in the Central District of Charam County, Kohgiluyeh and Boyer-Ahmad Province, Iran. At the 2006 census, its population was 552, in 89 families.

References 

Populated places in Charam County